Waldo is an unincorporated community in Lake County, Minnesota, United States, near Two Harbors and Stewart. It is within Lake No. 2 Unorganized Territory. Waldo is 4 miles north of Two Harbors.

References

Unincorporated communities in Minnesota
Unincorporated communities in Lake County, Minnesota

+